Events in the year 1775 in Norway.

Incumbents
Monarch: Christian VII

Events

Arts and literature

Births
11 March - Nils Landmark, jurist, farmer and politician (died 1859)
15 May – Enevold Steenblock Høyum, Norwegian military officer, representative at the Norwegian Constitutional Assembly (died 1830)
9 October - Lars Johannes Irgens, jurist and politician (died 1830)
17 October - Ole Paulssøn Haagenstad, politician (died 1866)

Full date unknown
Christian Adolph Diriks, politician and Minister (died 1837)
Jens Erichstrup, politician (died 1826)

Deaths

References

See also